Twyn-yr-Odyn is a hamlet in the Vale of Glamorgan, southeast Wales, just beyond the territorial border of western Cardiff. It lies just southwest of Culverhouse Cross, very close to Wenvoe and St Lythans. The Wenvoe Transmitter is located here. It is home to a pub named the Horse and Jockey Inn.
There is an allotment in the vicinity.

References

Villages in the Vale of Glamorgan